Bandarawatta Parakrama Maha Vidyalaya (Sinhala: බණ්ඩාරවත්ත පරාක්‍රම මහා විද්‍යාලය) is a public school in Gampaha district in Sri Lanka. It was established in 1869.

Houses 
The students are divided into four Houses: 
 Gemunu (Green)
 Parakrama (Yellow)
 Tissa (Blue)
 Vijaya (Red)
The names come from past kings of Sri Lanka.

Notable alumni
 W. L. Siriwardhana - Captain of Sri Lanka national volleyball team
Sachithra Senanayake - Sri Lanka Cricket National Team

References

Schools in Gampaha
Schools in Gampaha District